The Community Music School of the Piedmont (also known as CMSP) is a private, non-profit music school headquartered in Upperville, Virginia, United States.  Other locations include: Middleburg, Purcellville, The Plains, and Aldie.  CMSP is an independent institution established in 1994 by Northern Virginia residents Shannon Davis and Martha Cotter. Mrs. Cotter continues to serve as Executive Director.  Today, there are more than 350 students enrolled in the CMSP, ranging in age from 10 months to 75 years. Students come from several counties in the Northern Virginia area, all of them in the most westerly part of the greater Washington, DC area.

History

The Community Music School of the Piedmont (CMSP) has been in operation in Virginia since 1994. It is a non-profit organization that enjoys status as a tax-exempt charitable organization under section 501 (c) 3 of the Internal Revenue Service code.  The school offers a wide range of group classes, ensemble programs, individual instruction, and music therapy.  In addition, it provides a variety of scholarship opportunities to qualified students. CMSP is a member of the National Guild of Community Schools of Arts Education and Associated Chamber Music Players. For the past 10 years, CMSP has been a recipient of grants from The Virginia Commission for the Arts and The National Endowment for the Arts.

Locations

CMSP is headquartered at Cox Hall, the parish hall of Trinity Episcopal Church in Upperville, Virginia. The school has a variety of satellite locations throughout Loudoun, Fauquier and Clarke counties. These locations are: Aldie, Middleburg, Purcellville, The Plains, Waterford, and Stephens City.

Many churches in the region share their space with CMSP. Beginning with the generosity of Trinity Church, the school's space-sharing model has evolved and expanded over the years, enabling CMSP to keep its occupancy expenses to a minimum, while at the same time funding a generous scholarship program.

Programs

 Music Together: (birth to four years) Music Together is a licensed music education program for very young children and their parents or caregivers. Classes include an artistically conceived flow of songs, movement, nursery rhymes, instrumental jam sessions and finger plays. These activities help children to develop rhythm and tonal skills. This series is given four times each year at four CMSP locations. Classes are held in the mornings and afternoons.
 Early Childhood Music: (Infant to five years) An outreach program conducted at the Piedmont Childcare Center. It presents a specially designed curriculum for the childcare center. Children explore sounds, rhythms, and music patterns through songs, movement, and instrumental play. This program of ten classes is offered in the fall and spring with an abbreviated version in the summer. Classes are held during the school day.
 After School Music: An outreach program conducted on site at local public elementary schools in collaboration with the school's Parent Teacher Organizations, providing class instruction. Weekly classes offered at discounted prices. Fall winter, spring, and summer sessions are offered. Students perform in CMSP recitals. Classes are held after the school day. CMSP's "After School Music" programs of instrumental instruction are held on site at various local elementary schools in western Loudoun County.  CMSP faculty members travel to the schools and students receive weekly instruction on flute, violin, recorder, at discounted rates subsidized by CMSP. Instrumental instruction is not part of the elementary school curriculum in most
 counties, so this addresses a very definite need.
 CMSP's "Instrument Petting Zoo" travels to daycare centers, elementary schools, and preschools in our community to offer a "hands on" experience for children with real musical instruments. This program, which is offered free of charge, has been supported by the corporate sponsorship of Target.
 Strings Day: A day-long workshop for CMSP string players and has invited other instrumentalists across our region. Students work on chamber pieces in their private lessons in preparation for Strings Day. During Strings Day they work on duets, trios, and quartets in practice sessions. Strings Day always includes a soccer match- Violins vs Cellos and Violas! The students give a concert at the end of the day, which is enjoyed by all!
 Chamber Music Workshop: A week-long workshop at which students participate in chamber ensembles with their fellow students.

Annual Candlelight Concerts

During the winter months, CMSP holds its Annual Candlelight Concert. Started in 2008, the concert is a fundraising event to raise money for student scholarships, community outreach programs and faculty development initiatives. Featured artists in this series:

 2020 Ari Isaacman-Beck & Gwen Krosnick
 2019 Donovan Stokes
 2018 Brian Ganz
 2017 Amit Peled
 2016 Rosa Lamoreaux
 2015 NOW - New Orchestra of Washington
 2014 J. Reilly Lewis & Members of the Washington Bach Consort
 2013 Time for Three
 2012 J. Reilly Lewis & Members of the Washington Bach Consort
 2011 John O'Conor
 2010 David Hardy & Lambert Orkis
 2009 John O'Conor & the Royal Irish Academy of Music Symphony Orchestra

External links

Music Together
National Guild for Community Arts Education
American String Teachers Association
Suzuki Association of the Americas
Associated Chamber Music Players

Schools in Fauquier County, Virginia
Music schools in Virginia
Educational institutions established in 1994
1994 establishments in Virginia